Eden Township is one of the fifteen townships of Seneca County, Ohio, United States.  The 2010 census found 2,188 people in the township.

Geography
Located in the southern part of the county, it borders the following townships:
Clinton Township - north
Scipio Township - northeast corner
Bloom Township - east
Lykens Township, Crawford County - southeast corner
Texas Township, Crawford County - south, east of Sycamore Township
Sycamore Township, Wyandot County - south, west of Texas Township
Tymochtee Township, Wyandot County - southwest corner
Seneca Township - west
Hopewell Township - northwest corner

No municipalities are located in Eden Township, although the unincorporated community of Melmore lies at the center of the township.

Name and history
Eden Township was organized in 1821.

Statewide, other Eden Townships are located in Licking and Wyandot counties.

Government
The township is governed by a three-member board of trustees, who are elected in November of odd-numbered years to a four-year term beginning on the following January 1. Two are elected in the year after the presidential election and one is elected in the year before it. There is also an elected township fiscal officer, who serves a four-year term beginning on April 1 of the year after the election, which is held in November of the year before the presidential election. Vacancies in the fiscal officership or on the board of trustees are filled by the remaining trustees.

The Eden township hall is located at the Fire Department/Town Hall on State Route 100 in Melmore Ohio

Meeting Date, Time & Place: First and third Monday of each month 7:30 p.m. Melmore Fire Station Melmore, OH 44845

Mailing address: Eden Township P O Box 70  Melmore OH 44845

References

External links
County website

Townships in Seneca County, Ohio
Townships in Ohio